Mahabeersthan is a locality in Bongaigaon, surrounded by localities of Paglasthan, Borpara and Chapaguri.  The nearest railway station, the New Bongaigaon Railway Station, is located in Bongaigaon.

See also
 Paglasthan
 Borpara, Bongaigaon
 Chapaguri, Bongaigaon
 Dhaligaon
 New Bongaigaon

References

Neighbourhoods in Bongaigaon